Július Hudáček (born 9 August 1988) is a Slovak ice hockey professional goaltender currently playing for Barys Astana of the Kontinental Hockey League (KHL).

Playing career
Hudáček spent several seasons in the Slovak Extraliga, first tending net for HK Spišská Nová Ves in 2003–04, then briefly with Poprad for the 2004–05 season, before returning again to HK Spišská Nová Ves.  From 2008-2011, he played primarily with HC Košice, spending some time with HK 2016 Trebišov and HC 46 Bardejov.

From 2011-2013, he played in Sweden, primarily for Frölunda HC.

After a brief stint with HC Sibir Novosibirsk of the Kontinental Hockey League and then with HC CSOB Pardubice of the Czech Extraliga in 2013-14, he returned to Sweden to play for Örebro HK where he played until 2017.  At Örebro, he was well-known for post-game on-ice comedic and acrobatic performances after team wins, known as "Hudashows".

After three seasons in Sweden, Hudáček opted for a return to the KHL for the 2017–18 season in securing a one-year deal with Russian club, Severstal Cherepovets, on April 27, 2017. Establishing himself as Severstal's starting goaltender, Hudáček appeared in 48 games with a 2.24 goals against average and .920 save percentage. He was selected to take part in the 2018 KHL All-Star Game and earned goaltender of the week honours for the week of March 2, 2018.

As a free agent, Hudáček opted to continue his KHL career by signing a one-year contract with his third Russian club, HC Spartak Moscow, on May 4, 2018.

Awards and honors

References

External links
 

1988 births
Living people
Barys Nur-Sultan players
Dinamo Riga players
Frölunda HC players
HC Košice players
Örebro HK players
HC Dynamo Pardubice players
Severstal Cherepovets players
HC Sibir Novosibirsk players
Södertälje SK players
HC Spartak Moscow players
HK Spišská Nová Ves players
Slovak ice hockey goaltenders
Sportspeople from Spišská Nová Ves
HC Sparta Praha players
HK 2016 Trebišov players
Slovak expatriate ice hockey players in Sweden
Slovak expatriate ice hockey players in Russia
Slovak expatriate ice hockey players in the Czech Republic
Expatriate ice hockey players in Latvia
Expatriate ice hockey players in Kazakhstan
Slovak expatriate sportspeople in Latvia
Slovak expatriate sportspeople in Kazakhstan